The Castalian Springs Mound State Historic Site (40SU14) (also known as Bledsoe's Lick Mound and Cheskiki Mound) is a Mississippian culture archaeological site located near the small unincorporated community of Castalian Springs in Sumner County, Tennessee. The site was first excavated in the 1890s and again as recently as the 2005 to 2011 archaeological field school led by Dr. Kevin E. Smith. A number of important finds have been associated with the site, most particularly several examples of Mississippian stone statuary and the Castalian Springs shell gorget held by the National Museum of the American Indian. The site is owned by the State of Tennessee and is a State Historic Site managed by the Bledsoe's Lick Association for the Tennessee Historical Commission. The site is not currently open to the public.

Site
The Castalian Springs site is the largest of four Mississippian mound centers on the eastern edge of the Nashville basin, located on a flood terrace of a tributary creek of the Cumberland River. It was occupied from 1100 to 1450 CE, with the main occupation dating to 1200-1325 CE. The site was first noted in the early 1820s by Ralph E.W. Earl, who did extensive digging at the site. He described a low earthen embankment with raised earthen towers enclosing , the remnants of what is now known to have been a wooden palisade. Over the years since Earls first description Euro-Americans have plowed the area for agricultural purposes and consequently the main platform mound and a few raised impressions are all that are still visible of the embankment and the 12 platform mounds once contained within it. Scattered throughout the area archaeologists have also found stone box graves, mortuary caves and other features thought to be associated with the Castalian Springs site. The karst terrain of the area produced numerous small caves, one of which is located a few hundred yards west of the Castalian Springs site. Known locally as the "Cave of the Skulls" (40SU126), this small cave was explored by Myer at sometime during one of his three excavation of the site.

Excavations
In the early 1890s and again in 1916-1917, amateur archaeologist William E. Myer (later a “special archeologist” with the Smithsonian) excavated parts of the site, including the stone box graves. He also excavated the large burial mound, which contained well over a hundred graves. Myer discovered several artifacts containing S.E.C.C. imagery, including many shell gorgets which were later acquired by the Museum of the American Indian in 1926.

The State of Tennessee purchased the site in 2005, and modern excavations were instituted by the Middle Tennessee State University. Dr. Kevin E. Smith conducted an archaeological dig school at the village site from 2005 through 2011. The Castalian Springs Archaeological Project is  a multi-year research project sponsored by the Department of Sociology and Anthropology at Middle Tennessee State University, the Bledsoe's Lick Historical Association and the Tennessee Division of Archaeology. Its stated objectives are to develop an initial understanding of the size and extent of the site, to develop trails and other facilities on the site without negatively impacting archaeological deposits, to give university students training in the methods and techniques of professional field and laboratory archaeology, and to emphasize to the public the value of archaeological research.

Important finds
A number of Mississippian stone statues have been dug up at the site, the first being sometime before 1823 when it is first mentioned. Since then several others have been found, including one believed to have been dug from the platform section of the main mound and several from one of the associated village areas. In 1892 an etched stone tablet was discovered at the site by Myer. The  by  limestone tablet is engraved with symbolic imagery associated with the S.E.C.C., specifically the upper torso of a human figure ceremonially dressed as a raptorial bird with a sun symbol on its chest. The iconography is very similar to depictions of the falcon dancer found on Mississippian copper plates excavated from locations across the Midwest and Southeast. The tablet was the second of only six such tablets that have been found in the Central Tennessee area. Another more famous engraved stone, the Thruston tablet, was found a short distance away from Castalian Springs site in 1878 on the banks of Rocky Creek in what is now Trousdale County, Tennessee. It is named for Gates P. Thruston, a Nashville lawyer turned avocational archaeologist who excavated many sites in the Nashville area and built up an extensive collection of artifacts, even though he did not discover the stone nor was it ever part of his collection. He did champion the stone and wrote an article for "The Antiquities of  Tennessee  and the Adjacent States" journal in 1890 when the tablet was held by the Tennessee Historical Society. It is presently part of the collection of the Tennessee State Museum in Nashville.

Myer also found a cache of over thirty engraved shell gorgets, several of which are now held by the N.M.A.I. The most important of the gorgets is carved in what is known as the Eddyville or Braden style, believed to have been associated with the Cahokia polity near Collinsville, Illinois. The gorget depicts a warrior figure holding a ceremonial mace in his left hand and severed head in his right. The figure also has the Forked Eye Surround Motif, the Bellows apron motif and the Bi-Lobed Arrow Motif, all of which are associated with the S.E.C.C. Falcon dancer. Although the design is often shown with the figure upright, holes drilled in the edge of the gorget for its suspension as a neck ornament show it was meant to be seen with the figure oriented sideways, although it is as yet unclear what this may signify. Also in the cache were two Cox style and two Nashville I style gorgets.

In 2005 a waterline replacement crew working on the right of way of State Route 25 discovered an intact Cox style gorget carved from a dark gray shale. This artifact is one of a very few Cox style motifs utilized on a  material other than marine shell. The Castalian Springs site is also one of only three sites in Middle Tennessee where ceramic sherds of a type known as Angel negative painted have been found. This type of Mississippian culture pottery is typically associated with Angel phase sites along the Ohio River.

See also
 Bledsoe's Station
 List of Mississippian sites
 Southeastern Ceremonial Complex

References

External links
 Daily journal entries by Dr Kevin E. Smith from excavations at Castalian Springs 2009-2011
 Three shell gorgets found at the site and on display at the N.M.A.I.-NMAI gorget 1, NMAI gorget 2, and NMAI gorget 3
 1878 Castalian Springs map
 Ancient slabs unearthed in Midstate tell history of area
 Grant preserves ancient village in Castalian Springs
 Poster

Middle Mississippian culture
Mounds in Tennessee
Geography of Sumner County, Tennessee
Archaeological sites in Tennessee
Native American history of Tennessee